Rat Fever is a 2011 Brazilian film directed by Claudio Assis.

The film premiered at the 2011 Paulínia Festival, where it won Best Film and seven other awards. It also showed at the 2012 International Film Festival Rotterdam. It also won São Paulo Association of Art Critics Award for Best Picture in 2012 and the Havana Star Prize for Best Film (Fiction) at the 2013 Havana Film Festival New York.

Cast 
Ângela Leal as Dona Marieta
Conceição Camarotti as Dona Anja
Hugo Gila as Bira
Irandhir Santos as Zizo
Juliano Cazarré as Boca
Maria Gladys as Stella Maris
Mariana Nunes as Rosângela
Matheus Nachtergaele as Paizinho
Nanda Costa as Eneida
Tânia Granussi as Vanessa
Vitor Araújo as Oncinha
Johnny Hooker as Zizo's Brother

References

External links 
 

Brazilian drama films
2011 films
2010s Portuguese-language films
Brazilian black-and-white films
2011 drama films